The Yatteyattah Nature Reserve is a protected sub tropical rainforest in Yatte Yattah on the south coast of New South Wales, Australia. The  reserve was formed from landed donated by a local farmer in the 1990's. The estimated elevation of the terrain is 546 meters.

Features
The rainforest is of scientific interest as it is the most significant southerly sub tropical rainforest remnant in Australia.

Significant tree species include Red Cedar, Myrtle Ebony, Deciduous Fig, Citronella, Silver Quandong, Whalebone Tree and Bollygum, many of which are near their southernmost limit of natural distribution. Outstanding also is the display of epiphytic ferns, such as Birds Nest Fern and Elkhorn Fern.

In 1964, a broad swathe was cut through this small forest for electrical power lines, despite the area being surrounded by clear country and declared a protected area.

Gallery

See also

 Protected areas of New South Wales

References

Nature reserves in New South Wales
Forests of New South Wales
South Coast (New South Wales)
1996 establishments in Australia
Protected areas established in 1996